The list of shipwrecks in 1997 includes ships sunk, foundered, grounded, or otherwise lost during 1997.

January

1 January

18 January

21 January

25 January

30 January

February

12 February

18 February

19 February

27 February

28 February

March

1 March

5 March

23 March

26 March

28 March

30 March

April

16 April

30 April

May

4 May

9 May

12 May

16 May

29 May

June

11 June

12 June

23 June

Unknown date

July

2 July

4 July

20 July

22 July

26 July

August

2 August

7 August

13 August

14 August

24 August

25 August

September

8 September

10 September

15 September

22 September

24 September

27 September

Unknown date

October

6 October

8 October

11 October

13 October

26 October

27 October

28 October

November

2 November

12 November

17 November

19 November

20 November

December

14 December

19 December

22 December

30 December

Unknown date

Unknown date

References

1997
 
Ship